Emmanuel François Varez called E. F. Varez (17 October 1780 – 8 September 1866) was an early 19th-century French playwright and novelist.

Born in the 1st arrondissement of Paris, Varez was a dramaturge at the Théâtre de l'Ambigu-Comique and the Théâtre de la Gaîté and his plays were presented, with some exceptions, on the stages of these two theatres.

He died in the 16th arrondissement of Paris.

Works 

 Le Gourmand puni, comedy in 1 act, 1803
 La Fille coupable, repentante, melodrama in 3 acts, extravaganza, 1804
 Une journée de Frédéric II, roi de Prusse, comédie-anecdote, in 1 act and in prose, 1804
 Le Criminel invisible, novel, 2 vol, Lacourière, 1807
 Frédéric de Guéréhard, duc de Lorraine, novel, 2 vol, Masson, 1808
 L'Homme de la forêt, novel, 2 vol, Collin, 1808
 Métusko, ou les Polonais, melodrama in 3 acts, extravaganza, from the novel by Pigault-Lebrun, with Séville, 1808
 Frédéric duc de Nevers, melodrama in 3 acts, with Jean-Baptiste Mardelle, 1810, music by Henry Darondeau
 Hilberge l'amazone, ou les Monténégrins, pantomime in 3 acts, with Jean-Guillaume-Antoine Cuvelier, 1810
 Herminie ou la Chaumière allemande, melodrama in 3 acts, extravaganza, 1812
 Laissez-moi faire, ou la Soubrette officieuse, vaudeville in 1 act, with Armand Séville, 1813
 Une vengeance de l'amour, ballet-pantomime in 1 act, extravaganza, 1813
 Vive la paix ! ou le Retour au village, impromptu in 1 act, mingled with songs and danses, with Coupart, 1814
 Le Troubadour portugais, melodrama in 3 acts, extravaganza, 1815
 Voilà notre bouquet ! ou le Cabinet littéraire, impromptu-vaudeville in 1 act, with Coupart, 1815
 Retournons à Paris, comedy in 1 act, mingled with vaudevilles, with Aimé Desprez, 1817
 Les Deux fugitifs, comedy in 2 acts, 1818
 Calas, drama in 3 acts and in prose, with Victor Ducange, 1819
 L'Ours et l'enfant, ou la Fille bannie, mimodrame in 3 acts, with Cuvelier, 1819
 Le Mari confident, comédie-vaudeville in 1 act, with Overnay and Jean-François-Constant Berrier, 1820
 Sigismond, ou les Rivaux illustres, melodrama in 3 acts and extravaganza, 1820
 Le Baptême, ou la Double fête, vaudeville in 1 act, with Antoine-Marie Coupart, 1821
 La Famille irlandaise, melodrama in 3 acts, with Théodore Nézel, 1821
 Adieu la Chaussée-d'Antin, comedy in 1 act, mingled with couplets, with Hippolyte Magnien, 1822
 Élodie, ou la Vierge du monastère, melodrama in 3 acts, 1822
 L'Inconnu, ou les Mystères, melodrama in 3 acts, 1822
 Un trait de bienfaisance, ou la Fête d'un bon maire, à-propos in 1 act mingled with couplets, with Coupart, 1822
 La Poule aux œufs d'or, ou l'Amour et la fortune, comédie-féerie in 1 act, mingled with vaudevilles, 1823
 Entre chien et loup, comedy in 1 act and in prose, with Magnien, 1824
 La Fête d'automne, tableau villageois in 1 act mingled with vaudevilles, with Coupart and Jacquelin, 1824
 Le Retour d'un brave, vaudeville in 1 act for the King's day, with Coupart and Jacquelin, 1824
 Le Petit postillon de Fimes, ou Deux fêtes pour une, historical à-propos in 1 act, with Coupart and Jacquelin, 1825
 Le Jour fatal, novel, Bouquin de La Souche, 1826
 Le Fils de l'invalide, one-act play, mingled with couplets, with Coupart, 1826
 La Demoiselle et la paysanne, comedy in 1 act and in prose, with Théodore Nézel, 1828
 Les lanciers et les marchandes de modes, one-act play, mingled with couplets, with Benjamin Antier, Nézel and Overnay, 1828
 La Comédie au château, one-act play, mingled with couplets, with Coupart and Jacques-André Jacquelin, 1829
 John Bull, ou le Chaudronnier anglais, play in 2 acts, with Nezel and Armand Joseph Overnay, 1830
 Tout pour ma fille, drame-vaudeville in 3 acts, mingled with couplets, with Charles Henri Ladislas Laurençot, Lubize and Petit, 1832
 Le Tartufe de village, vaudeville in 1 act, with Lubize and Petit, 1833
 Chambre à louer, comédie-vaudeville in 1 act, 1834
 Le Château d'Oppenheim, novel, Bibliothèque de romans nouveaux, 1834
 Une partie de campagne, novel, Bibliothèque des romans nouveaux, 1834
 Le Fils de Ninon, drama in 3 acts, mingled with songs, with Jacques-Arsène-François-Polycarpe Ancelot et Hippolyte Rimbaut, 1834
 Eustache, folie-vaudeville in 1 act, 1839

Bibliography
 Joseph Marie Quérard, La France littéraire, vol. 10 (VAB-ZYG), 1839, p. 52–54.
 J. M. Quérard, Les Supercheries littéraires dévoilées, vol. 5 (1853), p. 396.

1780 births
1866 deaths
19th-century French dramatists and playwrights
19th-century French novelists
Writers from Paris